Trevor Frederick Jacobs (28 November 1946 – 18 January 2014) was an English footballer who played as a right back. He made over 210 Football League appearances in the years after the Second World War.

Career
Trevor Jacobs played youth football with Bristol City. Fred Ford signed Jacobs as a professional in July 1965 from apprentice for Bristol City.

Honours
with Bristol Rovers
Football League Third Division runners up: 1973–74

References

1946 births
Footballers from Bristol
English footballers
Association football fullbacks
English Football League players
Southern Football League players
Western Football League players
Bristol City F.C. players
Plymouth Argyle F.C. players
Bristol Rovers F.C. players
Bideford A.F.C. players
Paulton Rovers F.C. players
Clevedon Town F.C. players
2014 deaths